The heavyweight division in mixed martial arts (MMA) generally groups fighters between .

Although many ambiguities exist within the lowerweight classes regarding division naming and weight limits, the Heavyweight division is, for the most part, uniform.  The Ultimate Fighting Championship (UFC) and most other North American MMA organizations such as Bellator MMA, WSOF, and King of the Cage (KOTC) abide by this interpretation to their 206–265 lb athletes as heavyweights. ONE Championship's heavyweight division is at 226–265 lb. Pancrase's overweight division was  before being revised to its current . 

Professional champions

Current champions
This table was last updated on March 5, 2023.

Most wins in heavyweight title bouts 

Note: the list includes wins in bouts for heavyweight titles of major promotions (UFC, ONE, Pride, Strikeforce, WEC)
Note: the list includes both undisputed and interim champions
 Active title reign

Most consecutive defenses of heavyweight title 

First title reign.

See also
List of current MMA Heavyweight champions
List of UFC Heavyweight Champions
List of Strikeforce Heavyweight Champions
List of Pancrase Heavyweight Champions
List of Road FC Heavyweight Champions

References
'''

Mixed martial arts weight classes